Skorpio is a weekly anthology comic magazine published in Argentina since 1974 to 1996 and in Italy since 1977 onwards.

History and profile 
Skorpio was created in July 1974 by Ediciones Record, with Alfredo Scutti serving as editorial director and Juan Zanotto as artistic supervisor. It is named after a character created by writer Eugenio Zappietro (under the pen name Ray Collins) and artist Ernesto R. Garcia Seijas. Because of the artistic freedom it granted, the magazine attracted all the major Argentine comic artists of the time.

The magazine got an immediate success. Skorpio also republished and repopulized Argentine classic comics such as Mort Cinder, Sergeant Kirk and El Eternauta.

The magazine eventually closed in Argentina in 1996.

The Italian version 
The Italian version of the magazine was launched in Italy in 1977 by Lancio Editore (now Editoriale Aurea), the same publisher of Lanciostory. Initially devoted almost entirely to the Argentine productions, since the early 1980s the Italian magazine gradually started including Italian and French-Belgian comics, and more rarely also American comics.

A weekly collection series, Raccolta Skorpio, is published from 2000.

See also
 List of magazines in Argentina   
 List of magazines in Italy

Notes

1974 establishments in Argentina
1996 disestablishments in Argentina
1977 establishments in Italy
Comics magazines published in Argentina
Comics magazines published in Italy
Spanish-language magazines
Italian-language magazines
Magazines established in 1975
Magazines disestablished in 1996
Weekly magazines published in Italy
Defunct magazines published in Argentina